Trachycorystes cratensis is a species of driftwood catfish endemic to Brazil where it is found in the state of Ceará in the Granjeiro River basin.  It grows to a length of 6.1 cm.

References 
 

Auchenipteridae
Fish described in 1937
Fish of South America
Fish of Brazil
Endemic fauna of Brazil
Taxa named by Alípio de Miranda-Ribeiro